George Marinkovich (born c. 1929) is a former American football player and coach. He served as the head football coach at Western Montana College—now known as the University of Montana Western—for one season, in 1968, compiling a record of  3–4. Marinkovich played college football at both Rutgers University and Montana State University, winning an NAIA Football National Championship at the latter as a member of the 1956 Montana State Bobcats football team.

Head coaching record

References

Living people
American football halfbacks
American football quarterbacks
Montana State Bobcats football coaches
Montana State Bobcats football players
Montana Western Bulldogs football coaches
Rutgers Scarlet Knights football players
1928 births